Martín Garnerone (born 29 September 1998) is an Argentine professional footballer who plays as a forward for Chaco For Ever, on loan from Belgrano.

Career
Garnerone's career started with Independiente Río Tercero, which preceded the forward joining Belgrano's ranks in 2016. He made the breakthrough under interim manager Julio Constantín ahead of the 2019 Copa de la Superliga, as Belgrano met Lanús across two legs. Garnerone was an unused substitute as the club won the first leg 3–2, but subsequently made his debut in the second leg on 20 April 2019 at the Estadio Ciudad de Lanús – Néstor Díaz Pérez; replacing Gonzalo Lencina after sixty-one minutes, with Lanús overturning the deficit to advance.

In April 2021, Garnerone was loaned out to Torneo Federal A side Racing de Córdoba until the end of the year. Ahead of the 2022 season, he was loaned out again, this time to Primera Nacional club Chaco For Ever for one year.

Career statistics
.

References

External links

1998 births
Living people
Sportspeople from Córdoba Province, Argentina
Argentine footballers
Association football forwards
Club Atlético Belgrano footballers
Racing de Córdoba footballers
Chaco For Ever footballers
Primera Nacional players